Ngātapa is a rural community in the Gisborne District of New Zealand's North Island.

In late 1868 and early 1869 between 86 and 128 followers of Te Kooti were executed on Ngātapa hill during the siege of Ngatapa. The Waitangi Tribunal described the siege as "one of the worst abuses of law and human rights in New Zealand’s colonial history". The 150th anniversary was commemorated in Ngatapa in January 2019.

Parks

Eastwoodhill Arboretum, the national arboretum of New Zealand, is located in Ngātapa. It includes a walkway and cycleway.

Marae

The Ngātapa Marae is a meeting ground of the Te Aitanga-a-Māhaki hapū of Te Whānau a Kai.

In October 2020, the Government committed $460,500 from the Provincial Growth Fund to upgrade Pakowhai Marae, Takitimu Marae and Ngātapa Marae, creating 13 jobs.

Transport 

Ngātapa is the terminus of the former Ngatapa Branch railway that closed in 1931. The locality is served by Wharekopae Road.

Education
Ngatapa School is a Year 1–8 co-educational state primary school. In 2019, it was a decile 8 school with a roll of 18.

Waerenga-o-Kuri School is a Year 1–8 co-educational state primary school. In 2019, it was a decile 9 school with two teachers and a roll of 46.

References

Populated places in the Gisborne District